Sherman Hall (May 11, 1885 – July 20, 1954) was an American épée and foil fencer. He competed in three events at the 1912 Summer Olympics.

References

External links
 

1885 births
1954 deaths
American male épée fencers
Olympic fencers of the United States
Fencers at the 1912 Summer Olympics
Sportspeople from Cambridge, Massachusetts
American male foil fencers